Antonio "Toñito" Silva Delgado is a Puerto Rican politician. He has been a member of the Puerto Rico House of Representatives since 1993.

Before been elected to the Puerto Rico House of Representatives Silva was the president of the Bayamón Municipal Assembly. He was first elected to the House of Representatives at the 1992 general election. He represents the District 8. Silva has been reelected five times (1996, 2000, 2004, 2008, 2012).

Silva is married to Yvonne Santiago. He also has three children from a previous marriage to Jenny Rivera: Antonio, Jenning, and Anthony. His youngest son, Anthony, died on June 15, 2010 from complications caused after an accident in a four-wheel ATV.

References

External links
Antonio Silva Official biography

Living people
New Progressive Party members of the House of Representatives of Puerto Rico
Year of birth missing (living people)